Dairymans Plains is a locality in the Snowy Monaro Region, New South Wales, Australia. It is located to the north of the Snowy Mountains Highway, to the immediate northwest of Cooma. It contains grazing country, a rural residential development, Cooma Golf Course and a large car wrecking yard.

Dairymans Plains had a school from 1881 to 1933, described as a "provisional" school from 1881 to 1884 and 1891 to 1899, as a "public" school from 1884 to 1890 and from 1899 to 1913 and a "half-time" school after 1913.

References

Snowy Monaro Regional Council
Localities in New South Wales